= Bohani, Kapurthala =

Bohani
- Village
- Location in Punjab, India Bohani (India)
- Coordinates: 31.332°N 75.720°E
- Country: India
- State: Punjab
- District: Kapurthala
- Tehsil: Phagwara

Government
  - Type: Panchayat raj
  - Body: Gram panchayat

Area
  - Total: 536 ha (1,320 acres)

Population (2011)
  - Total: 1,346; 688/658 ♂/♀
  - Scheduled Castes: 595; 294/301 ♂/♀
  - Total Households: 272

Languages
  - Official: Punjabi
- Time zone: UTC+5:30 (IST)
- ISO 3166 code: IN-PB
- Website: kapurthala.gov.in

Bohani is a village in Phagwara in Kapurthala district of Punjab State, India. It is located 15 kilometres (9.3 mi) from sub district headquarter and 43 kilometres (27 mi) from district headquarter. The village is administrated by Sarpanch an elected representative of the village.

== Demography ==
As of 2011, The village has a total number of 272 houses and the population of 1346 of which 688 are males while 658 are females. According to the report published by Census India in 2011, out of the total population of the village 595 people are from Schedule Caste and the village does not have any Schedule Tribe population so far.

== See also ==
- List of villages in India
